The Bouncer is the final studio album by pianist Cedar Walton. It was recorded in 2011 and released on the Highnote label.

Reception
AllMusic reviewed the album stating "The Bouncer, features the journeyman hard bopper leading a fine quintet of like-minded individuals". JazzTimes observed "There’s nothing particularly groundbreaking about anything on the disc, mind you. But listeners looking for new music set solidly in the postbop tradition would be hard-pressed to do better than this". BBC Music noted "Ultimately, this album isn't going to burn any bold new paths in jazz, but it’s a soulful summation made in the still-glowing twilight of an old-faithful’s career".

Track listing 
All compositions by Cedar Walton except where noted
 "The Bouncer" - 5:26
 "Lament" (J. J. Johnson) - 9:38
 "Bell for Bags" - 5:29
 "Halo" - 5:01
 "Underground Memoirs" - 7:18
 "Willie's Groove" - 6:09
 "Got to Get to the Island" (David Williams) - 9:17
 "Martha's Prize" - 6:29

Personnel 
Cedar Walton - piano
Vincent Herring - alto saxophone, tenor saxophone , flute
Steve Turre - trombone (tracks 1 & 5 only)
David Williams - bass
Willie Jones III - drums
Ray Mantilla - percussion (track 5 only)

Production
Don Sickler - producer
Rudy Van Gelder - engineer

References 

Cedar Walton albums
2011 albums
HighNote Records albums
Albums recorded at Van Gelder Studio